Matthew Robert Whichelow (born 28 September 1991) is an English-born Montserratian semi-professional footballer who plays as a winger.

Career

Club career
Whichelow was born in Islington, London. He made his Championship debut for Watford against Scunthorpe United on 23 October 2010 as a late substitute, and again came on at half time in the match against Derby County on 30 October 2010, scoring his first professional goal within ten minutes. Whichelow featured for Watford 17 more times during the 2010–11 season, which included 4 starts and 2 goals.

Having missed most of pre-season for Watford, Whichelow joined Exeter City on loan on 16 September 2011 for a month to gain match fitness. Whichelow came on for Watford in the second half against Tottenham Hotspur in the FA Cup on 27 January to make only his second appearance for Watford all season. He was however loaned out again, this time to Wycombe Wanderers on a one-month youth loan deal on 31 January 2012. He scored on his debut against Tranmere Rovers.

Whichelow was then loaned to League Two club Accrington Stanley on a month's loan in September 2012. His loan was extended into a second and third month, where he made a total of 4 appearances. He returned to parent club Watford on 20 December.

On 4 February 2013, Watford confirmed that Whichelow had been released by mutual consent. He spent the last few months of the 2012–13 season training with Forest Green Rovers and in July 2013 spent time on trial with Braintree Town. He joined Boreham Wood in August 2013. He made his debut on 17 August 2013 in a 2–0 win against Tonbridge Angels. On 16 October 2015, Whichelow joined Chelmsford City on a three-month loan deal. Whichelow scored twice on his debut for Chelmsford City in a 1–2 victory away at Basingstoke Town.

On 7 March 2020, he signed for Kings Langley.

International career
Whichelow was called up by Montserrat in October 2019, making his debut against the Dominican Republic.

Career statistics

Club

International

Honours
Boreham Wood
Conference South play-offs: 2014–15

References

External links

1991 births
Living people
Footballers from Islington (district)
Montserratian footballers
Montserrat international footballers
English footballers
English people of Montserratian descent
Association football wingers
Watford F.C. players
Exeter City F.C. players
Wycombe Wanderers F.C. players
Accrington Stanley F.C. players
Boreham Wood F.C. players
Chelmsford City F.C. players
Oxford City F.C. players
Wealdstone F.C. players
Hampton & Richmond Borough F.C. players
Kings Langley F.C. players
English Football League players
National League (English football) players